Brumfield is an unincorporated community in Boyle County, Kentucky, in the United States.

History
Brumfield was a station on the railroad. A post office was established at Brumfield in 1880, and remained in operation until it was discontinued in 1938.

References

Unincorporated communities in Boyle County, Kentucky
Unincorporated communities in Kentucky